Kalerwe Market is one of Uganda's largest markets and is located on Gayaza Road adjacent the Northern By-pass about   from Kampala City centre.  The market sells primarily fruits, vegetables and meat from all around Uganda, including Luwero, Mbarara, Wakiso and Mukono among others.  Among the hundreds of vendors, the most common items for sale are:

 Fruits
 Yellow Bananas
 Vegetables
 Matooke
 Cassava roots
 Beans
 Potatoes
 Chicken
 Goat Meat
 Fish

References

http://www.wildgorillasafaris.com/gorilla-news/kalerwe-market-provides-tourists-with-fruits.html
http://katonatours.com/
http://fortuneofafrica.com/ug/kalerwe-market/

Kampala Capital City Authority
Tourist attractions in Uganda
Retail markets